The 2014 Best Footballer in Asia, given to the best football player in Asia as judged by a panel of sports journalists, was awarded to Son Heung-min on 28 November 2014.

Voting
The panel of jurors was constituted by 24 journalists. 20 journalists represent AFC countries/regions including Australia, Bahrain, Bangladesh, China, Hong Kong, India, Japan, Korea Republic, Kuwait, Macao, Malaysia, Palestine, Qatar, Saudi Arabia, Tajikistan, Thailand,  Turkmenistan, United Arabic Emirates, Uzbekistan, Vietnam and 4 journalists represent media outlets of non- AFC countries/regions including England, France, Germany and Italy.

Ranking

References 

2014
2014 awards
2014 in Asian football